The 3rd Independent Spirit Awards, honoring the best in independent filmmaking for 1987, were announced on February 11, 1988. The ceremony was hosted by Buck Henry and was held at 385 North, a restaurant in Los Angeles.

Winners and nominees

Films with multiple nominations and awards

References

External links
 1987 Spirit Awards at IMDb
 Official ceremony on YouTube

1987
Independent Spirit Awards